Colquioc (Hispanicized spelling of the Quechua term Qullqiyuq, qullqi silver, -yuq a suffix, "the one with silver") is one of the fifteen districts of the province Bolognesi in Peru.

References

Districts of the Bolognesi Province
Districts of the Ancash Region